Princess Jeongsin (Hangul: 정신궁주 or 정신공주, Hanja: 貞信宮主 or 貞信公主; d. 1421) was a Goryeo Royal Princess as the second daughter of King Gongyang and Royal Consort Sun.

Life
In 17 April 1390, she honoured as Princess Jeongsin (정신궁주, 貞信宮主) along with her sisters, then married with U Seong-beom (우성범) whom later honoured as Prince Danyang (단양군). However, in July 1392, after Yi Seong-Gye's ascension to the throne and made the new dynasty, U was sentenced to death and was beheaded along with Gang Hoe-gye (강회계), her younger brother-in-law.

U Seong-Beom came from the Danyang U clan (단양 우씨, 丹陽 禹氏) who was the son of U Hong-su (우홍수) and the grandson of U Hyeon-bo (우현보). With U, she had one issue, a daughter. While the Princess's father-in-law tried to conspired, it was failed and died after being executed by Taejo's royal troops in 23 August.

Family 
 Father - King Gongyang of Goryeo (고려 공양왕) (9 March 1345 - 17 May 1394)
 Grandfather - Wang Gyun, Prince Jeongwon (정원부원군 왕균)
 Grandmother - Grand Royal Consort Guk of the Kaesong Wang clan (국대비 왕씨)
 Mother - Royal Consort Sun of the Gyoha No clan (순비 노씨) (? - 1394) 
 Grandfather - No Jin (노진, 盧稹) (? - 1376)
 Grandmother - Royal Consort Myeongui of the Hong clan (명의비 홍씨, 明懿妃 洪氏)
 Siblings 
 Older sister - Princess Suknyeong (숙녕궁주)
 Brother-in-law - Wang Jip, Prince Ikcheon (익천군 왕집, 王緝) (? - 1392)
 Younger sister - Princess Gyeonghwa (경화궁주)
 Brother-in-law - Kang Hoe-gye (강회계, 姜淮季) (? - 1392)
 Younger brother - Wang Seok, Prince Jeongseong (왕석 정성군) (? - 1394)
 Sister-in-law - Lady Lee of the Incheon Lee clan (인천 이씨, 仁川 李氏)
 Husband - Woo Seong-beom (우성범, 禹成範) (? - 31 July 1392)
 Father-in-law - Woo Hong-su (우홍수, 禹洪壽) (1355 - 1392)
 Mother-in-law - Lady Yun of the Musong Yun clan (무송 윤씨, 茂松 尹氏)
 Issue 
 Daughter - Woo Gye-in (우계인), Lady Woo of the Danyang Woo clan 
 Son-in-law - Jeong Yeon (정연, 鄭淵)
 Granddaughter - Princess Consort Jeong of the Yeongil Jeong clan (? – 31 May 1453) (부부인 영일 정씨)
 Grandson-in-law - Yi Yong, Grand Prince Anpyeong (18 October 1418 – 18 November 1453) (이용 안평대군)
 Great-Grandson - Yi Woo-jik, Prince Uichun (의춘군 이우직) (1439 - 1454)
 Great-Grandson - Yi Woo-ryang, Prince Deokyang (덕양군 우량) (? - 1452)

References

Year of birth unknown
14th-century births
14th-century Korean people
1421 deaths
Goryeo princesses
15th-century Korean people